DWJX (89.5 FM), broadcasting as 89.5 OKFM, is a radio station owned and operated by PBN Broadcasting Network. Its studios and transmitter are located at the 4th Floor, ABA Fruits Bldg., J. Reyes St. cor. Burgos St., Brgy. Talisay, Sorsogon City.

References

Radio stations in Sorsogon
Radio stations established in 2017